Madeleine Philion (born February 21, 1963) is a Canadian fencer. She competed in the women's individual and team foil events at the 1984 and 1988 Summer Olympics.

References

External links
 

1963 births
Living people
Canadian female fencers
Fencers at the 1984 Summer Olympics
Fencers at the 1988 Summer Olympics
Olympic fencers of Canada
Sportspeople from Gatineau
Pan American Games medalists in fencing
Pan American Games silver medalists for Canada
Universiade medalists in fencing
Fencers at the 1987 Pan American Games
Universiade bronze medalists for Canada
Medalists at the 1983 Summer Universiade
Medalists at the 1987 Pan American Games